Camp Yehoshua named after IDF General  (1905-1947) may refer to:

A former military base in HaKirya, Israel
IDF recruit training base   within the Nitzanim Nature Reserve